Mongezi Thomas Stuurman (22 September 1995 – 9 August 2021), known professionally as Mpura, was a South African rapper, fashion designer and record producer best known for his hit song "Umsebenzi Wethu"

Early life and education
Mpura was born and raised in Soweto, Gauteng . He attended Highlands North Boys’ High School.

Career
Before he rose to fame in the music industry, he was involved in fashion and founded Mpura Designs, a unisex street style brand. In 2018, he made his South African Fashion Week debut, showcasing his Autumn/Winter 2019 collection.

On December 11, 2020, he and Busta 929 featuring  Lady Du, Reece Madlisa, Mr JazziQ and Zuma single  Umsebenzi Wethu was released. The  song reached number one local iTunes charts  and was certified  platinum.

Awards and nominations

Death
On 9 August 2021, Mpura died in a car accident on his way to perform at an event in the North West, alongside Killer Kau.

References

External links
 

1995 births
2021 deaths
Amapiano musicians
South African rappers
South African fashion designers
South African musicians
People from Alexandra, Gauteng
Road incident deaths in South Africa